Satcha Sip Prakan  (MIT, สัจจะ ๑๐ ประการ) was the twelvend album by Thai rock band Carabao. It was released in 1992.

Track listing

1992 albums
Carabao (band) albums